James Jeffrey Binney, FRS, FInstP (born 12 April 1950) is a British astrophysicist. He is a professor of physics at the University of Oxford and former head of the Sub-Department of Theoretical Physics as well as an Emeritus Fellow of Merton College. Binney is known principally for his work in theoretical galactic and extragalactic astrophysics, though he has made a number of contributions to areas outside of astrophysics as well.

Education and career
Binney took a first class BA in the Mathematical Tripos at the University of Cambridge in 1971, then moved to the University of Oxford, reading for a DPhil at Christ Church under Dennis Sciama, which he completed in 1975. He was a visiting scholar at the Institute for Advanced Study, Princeton in 1983–87 and again in the fall of 1989. After holding several post-doctoral positions, including a junior research fellowship at Magdalen College, and a position at Princeton University, Binney returned to Oxford as a university lecturer and fellow and tutor in physics at Merton College in 1981.  He was subsequently made ad hominem reader in theoretical physics in 1991 and professor of physics in 1996.

Binney has received a number of awards and honours for his work, including the Maxwell Prize of the Institute of Physics in 1986, the Brouwer Award of the American Astronomical Society in 2003, the Dirac Medal in 2010, and the Eddington Medal in 2013. He has been a fellow of the Royal Astronomical Society since 1973, and was made a Fellow of the Royal Society and a fellow of the Institute of Physics, both in 2000. He sits on the European Advisory Board of Princeton University Press.

Interests
Binney's research interests have included:

 Physics of cooling flows and the processes of AGN feedback;
 Supernova disruption of galactic disk gas;
 Dynamics of galaxies, including those of the Milky Way;
 Galaxy and orbit modelling, including development of torus modelling techniques.

Publications
Binney has authored over 200 articles in peer-reviewed journals and several textbooks, including Galactic Dynamics, which has long been considered the standard work of reference in its field.

Books:
Galactic Astronomy, by Dimitri Mihalas and James Binney, Freeman 1981.
Galactic Dynamics, by James Binney and Scott Tremaine, Princeton University Press, 1988.
The Theory of Critical Phenomena by J. J. Binney, N. J. Dowrick, A. J. Fisher & M. E. J. Newman, Oxford University Press, 1992.
Galactic Astronomy (2nd ed.), by James Binney and Michael Merrifield, Princeton University Press, 1998.
Galactic Dynamics (2nd ed.), by James Binney and Scott Tremaine, Princeton University Press, 2008.

References

External links
Faculty page, Centre for Theoretical Physics, University of Oxford (includes a short biography)

People educated at King's College School, London
20th-century British astronomers
British physicists
Fellows of the Royal Society
Institute for Advanced Study visiting scholars
Living people
1950 births
Maxwell Medal and Prize recipients
Fellows of the Royal Astronomical Society
Fellows of the Institute of Physics
Fellows of Merton College, Oxford
21st-century British astronomers